Sodium polysulfide is a general term for salts with the formula Na2Sx, where x = 2 to 5.  The species Sx2−, called polysulfide anions, include disulfide (S22−), trisulfide (S32−), tetrasulfide (S42−), and pentasulfide (S52−). In principle, but not in practice, the chain lengths could be longer. The salts are dark red solids that dissolve in water to give highly alkaline and corrosive solutions. In air, these salts oxidize, and they evolve hydrogen sulfide by hydrolysis.

Structure
The polysulfide anions form chains with S---S bond distances around 2 Å in length. The chains adopt skewed conformations.  In the solid state, these salts are dense solids with strong association of the sodium cations with the anionic termini of the chains.

Production and occurrence
Sodium polysulfide can be produced by dissolving sulfur in a solution of sodium sulfide.  Alternatively they are produced by the redox reaction of aqueous sodium hydroxide with sulfur at elevated temperatures.  Finally they arise by the reduction of elemental sulfur with sodium, a reaction often conducted in anhydrous ammonia.

These salts are used in the production of polysulfide polymers, as a chemical fungicide, as a blackening agent on copper jewellery, as a component in a polysulfide bromide battery, as a toner in a photochemical solution, and in the tanning industry to remove hair from hides.

Reactions
As exploited in the sodium-sulfur battery, the polysulfides absorb and release reducing equivalents by breaking and making S-S bonds, respectively.  An idealized reaction for sodium tetrasulfide is shown:
Na2S4  +  2 Na      2 Na2S2

Alkylation gives organic polysulfides according to the following idealized equation:
Na2S4  +  2 RX   →   2 NaX  +  R2S4
Alkylation with an organic dihalide gives polymers called thiokols.

Protonation of these salts gives hydrogen sulfide and elemental sulfur, as illustrated by the reaction of sodium pentasulfide:
Na2S5  +  2 HCl   →   H2S  +  4 S  +  2 NaCl

References

Polysulfides
Sodium compounds